West of Sunshine is a film set and shot in the western suburbs of Melbourne, Australia, and depicts an eventful day in the life of working-class Jimmy, an inveterate gambler, and his estranged son Alex.

Plot
Scruffy-haired, heavily tattooed Jimmy (Damian Hill) is a courier for a small company, and has a $15,000 debt to Banos (Tony Nikolakopoulos), the tough owner of a car repair shop where Jimmy once worked, and who has given him a deadline of 5 o'clock that day to repay him or suffer dire consequences.
Jimmy's mind is preoccupied with the prospects of a horse that's running (race two at Ballarat) that day. He picks up his mate Steve (Arthur Angel), a fellow courier.
He is late to pick up his pre-pubescent son Alex (Hill's real-life stepson Tyler Perham), who he's promised to baby-sit that day, and is harassed by his ex-wife Karen (Faye Smythe).
He arrives at her house in his car, an immaculate 1968 Ford Fairlane, previously owned from new by his own father, who deserted his family when Jimmy was young. 

Alex reluctantly joins his father, for whom he has no respect, and flagrantly defies his every instruction. His father's chief leverage over him (and subject of much of the bickering) is use of his smartphone and promise of a new (soccer) football.
Jimmy reports late for work at the depot, and because of the presence of Alex is obliged to use the Fairlane for deliveries rather than a company vehicle. Alex gets to experience the inside of a variety of Melbourne businesses.
 
His deliveries completed, they stop for lunch at a suburban hotel with TAB facilities, and are joined by Steve. Jimmy is anxious to put some money on his tip, and borrows a substantial sum from Steve, who puts somewhat less on the same horse, which comes home and Jimmy has more than enough to pay off his debts. 
He rings Banos with the good news, but cannot however refrain from trying to build on his good fortune and loses the lot. Fearing Banos, he pleads with Steve to lend him the money, alienating his mate, who refuses point blank: he has debts too.
Getting desperate, Jimmy offers the Fairlane to a used-car dealer; it's valued at $35,000 but they settle on $25,000 cash. But while the would-be purchaser is at the bank, Jimmy has a change of heart and he and Alex drive off.
Steve approaches Mel (Kat Stewart), a friend from his younger days, who has prospered and now has a small bakery. She offers to lend him the sum if he will deliver some small zip-lock packages of white powder to various addresses. He tells Alex they contain vitamin C.
While Jimmy is purchasing icecreams at a roadside van, Alex opens one of the bags and just as he is putting some in his mouth, Jimmy becomes aware of the situation, rushes back to the car and forces Alex to cough it up. He confesses the truth to Alex, they exchange confidences resulting in a reconciliation.
Jimmy confronts Banos with the few hundreds of dollars he has left, and Banos signals to his men, then as they have beaten him to the ground and are kicking him, Banos calls them off in a seeming change of heart.

Jimmy signs the car over to Banos and pedals a pushbike back to his ex-wife's residence, Alex on the handle-bars.
Night is falling, and when asked by his mother how the day went, he replied "It was the best day ever".

Filming
West of Sunshine was shot in wide-screen format, mostly in the suburbs and inner city of Melbourne; many scenes were shot in real business premises with the workers going about their usual business. The edited film runs for 78 minutes. Director was Jason Raftopoulos.

Reception
The film was shown at the Venice Biennale, in the Orrizonti section. It received generally favorable reviews, some tracing its inspiration to Vittorio De Sica's Bicycle Thieves; most commenting that it sprang no surprises. Several noted that it was the offshoot of Raftopolous' 2011 short Father’s Day and Paul Ireland's short Pawno (also starring Hill).  Thom Neal's cinematography was praised, as was the soundtrack by Lisa Gerrard and James Orr.

External links

References 

Australian drama films
Films about father–son relationships
Films shot in Melbourne